Alberto or Albertino Piazza (1490–1528) was an Italian painter. He was born and died in Lodi, Lombardy. His elder brother Martino was also a painter.

References

External links

 

1490 births
1528 deaths
16th-century Italian painters
Italian male painters
People from Lodi, Lombardy